Patissa is a genus of moths of the family Crambidae erected by Frederic Moore in 1886.

Species
Patissa aenealis Hampson, 1899
Patissa atricostalis Hampson, 1919
Patissa atrilinealis Hampson, 1919
Patissa burmanalis (C. Swinhoe, 1890)
Patissa coenicosta de Joannis, 1930
Patissa curvilinealis Hampson, 1896
Patissa erythrozonalis Hampson, 1896
Patissa fractilinealis Hampson, 1919
Patissa fulvicepsalis Hampson, 1919
Patissa fulvidorsalis Hampson, 1903
Patissa fulvipunctalis Hampson, 1919
Patissa fulvosparsa Butler, 1881
Patissa geminalis Hampson, 1919
Patissa heldi E. Hering, 1903
Patissa interfuscalis Hampson, 1899
Patissa intersticalis Hampson, 1908
Patissa lactealis (C. Felder, R. Felder & Rogenhofer, 1875)
Patissa latifuscalis Hampson, 1896
Patissa melitopis (Meyrick, 1933)
Patissa minima Inoue, 1995
Patissa monostidzalis Hampson, 1919
Patissa nigropunctata (Wileman & South, 1918)
Patissa ochreipalpalis Hampson, 1919
Patissa ochroalis Hampson, 1919
Patissa pentamita (Turner, 1911)
Patissa percnopis (Meyrick, 1933)
Patissa pulverea (Hampson, 1919)
Patissa punctum de Joannis, 1930
Patissa rubrilinealis Hampson, 1919
Patissa rufitinctalis Hampson, 1919
Patissa stenopteralis Hampson, 1919
Patissa taiwanalis (Shibuya, 1928)
Patissa tenuousa Chen, Song & Wu, 2007
Patissa termipunctalis (Hampson, 1919)
Patissa tinctalis (Hampson, 1919)
Patissa tonkinialis Caradja, 1926
Patissa vagilinealis Hampson, 1908
Patissa virginea Zeller, 1863
Patissa xanthoperas (Hampson, 1896)

References

Schoenobiinae
Crambidae genera
Taxa named by Frederic Moore